St. Margaret's Bay is the westernmost administrative planning district of the Halifax Regional Municipality in the Canadian province of Nova Scotia.

It is a rural area located on the southwestern part of Halifax County comprising those communities in the county located on the eastern and northern shores of St. Margaret's Bay through to the county line, terminating at the community of Hubbards. It borders on Hants County to the north and on Lunenburg County to the west.

References

Landforms of Halifax, Nova Scotia
Landforms of Halifax County, Nova Scotia